"Junge Roemer" ("Young Romans") is a song by Falco from his 1984 studio album Junge Roemer. The song was also released as a single, it was the first single from the album.

Background and writing 
The song was written by Robert Ponger and Falco. The recording was produced by Robert Ponger.

Commercial performance 
The song reached no. 8 in Austria and no. 24 in Switzerland.

Track listings 
7" single GIG 111 147 (Germany)
7" single GUG 76.12 990 (Germany)
7" single A&M AMS 9769 (Netherlands)
 "Junge Roemer" (4:04)
 "No Answer (Hallo Deutschland)" (3:39)
 		 	 
12" maxi single GIG 620 330 1
 "Junge Roemer" (Extended Version) (7:43)
 "Brillantin' Brutal'" (3:48)

Charts

References

External links 
 Falco – "Junge Roemer" at Discogs

Songs about Rome
1990 songs
1990 singles
Falco (musician) songs
Songs written by Falco (musician)
Songs written by Robert Ponger